Kirchspiel may refer to:
 the German word for church parish
 one of the town subdivisions of Dülmen, North Rhine-Westphalia, Germany